Xındırıstan is a village and municipality in the Aghdam District of Azerbaijan. It has a population of 6,502. The municipality consists of the villages of Khyndyrystan, Dadaşlı, Sarıçoban, Qasımbəyli, Kəbləhüseynli, Paşabəyli, Birinci Yüzbaşılı, İkinci Yüzbaşılı, Baharlı, and Bəybabalar.

References 

Populated places in Aghdam District